Lumina may refer to:

Arts, entertainment, and media

Literature
 Lumina, a literary journal published by Sarah Lawrence College
 World of Lumina or Lumina, a graphic novel by Emanuele Tenderini and Linda Cavallini

Music
 "Lumina", a song by Joan Osborne from Relish (album)

Video games
 Lumina, an Elemental Spirit in the role-playing game Secret of Mana
 "Lumina, the Sword of Luminescence", an elemental sword wielded by the titular protagonist, Brave Fencer Musashi

Automobiles
 Chevrolet Lumina, a 1989–2001 American mid-size car
 Chevrolet Lumina APV, a 1990–1996 American minivan
 Holden Commodore, a 1978–2020 Australian mid-size car, sold in various markets as the Chevrolet Lumina from 1998 to 2011

Businesses and organizations
 Lumina Foundation for Education, an American grant-making foundation
 Lumina Media, a former American publisher

Places
 Lumina, Constanța, Romania, a commune
 LUMINA, a residential development in San Francisco

Other uses
 Lumina (desktop environment), for TrueOS and other Unix and Unix-like systems
 Lumina (typeface), a foundry type made by Ludwig & Mayer
 Lumina, the plural form for Lumen (anatomy), the innermost layer of a hollow organ such as the stomach or an artery